Lukáš Urban (born 23 June 1993) is a Slovak football midfielder who currently plays for the 3. liga club FC Košice.

MFK Košice
He made his debut for the club in a 2–2 home Corgoň Liga draw against MFK Ružomberok, coming on as an 80th minute substitution.

External links
MFK Košice profile

References

1993 births
Living people
Slovak footballers
Association football midfielders
FC VSS Košice players
Slovak Super Liga players
Sportspeople from Košice